Sterling Forest may refer to:

Sterling Forest, New York, a hamlet in the Town of Warwick, Orange County
Sterling Forest State Park, in the Ramapo Mountains in Orange County, New York
Sterling Forest, a poem by Patti Smith from her 1978 book Babel

See also
Sterling State Park, Michigan